The Estadio Roberto Natalio Carminatti is a multi-use stadium in Bahía Blanca, Argentina. It is currently the biggest stadium of the city, and is used mostly for football matches. It is the home of Olimpo. The stadium has a capacity of 20,000. In the 2016–17 season, Olimpo, Defensa y Justicia and Vélez Sarsfield drew an average home league attendance of 10,000.

References

External links
Stadium information

Olimpo de Bahía Blanca
Roberto Natalio Carminatti
Sports venues in Buenos Aires Province